Jon Hicks may refer to:

Jon Hicks (designer) (born 1972), English designer and creator of the Firefox logo
Jon Hicks (journalist), English journalist and editor of the UK edition of Official Xbox Magazine

See also
John Hicks (disambiguation)